My New Moon is a studio album by American musician Amos Lee, released via Dualtone Records on August31, 2018. It received mixed reviews from critics but praise for the depth of Lee's emotional resonance. Many of the themes come from Lee's introspection as an artist and emotional struggles in the face of violence and his place in the world.

Critical reception
Album of the Year summed up critical consensus as a 68 out of 100, based on four reviews. A positive review came from the editorial staff of AllMusic Guide who awarded it four out of five stars and highlighted it as the "Best of 2018", with reviewer Matt Collar accenting the range of emotions in Lee's writing, calling this "ruminative if still uplifting album, characterized by emotive melodies and an earthy soulfulness". Amanda Wicks of Pitchfork gave the album a seven out of 10, also praising the depth of feeling in the lyrics as well as Lee's ability to transition into Americana to keep from stagnating as an artist. For PopMatters, Chris Ingalls finds a few moments that work on the album but assesses that "it doesn't take long for things to fall apart" and while he notes that Lee is a talented singer and songwriter, he uses cliches on this recording and it fees like a "lazy stopgap"; he scores it a six out of 10.

Sales
My New Moon peaked at 49 on the Billboard 200 and at fourth place on Top Rock Albums.

Track listing
All songs are written by Amos Lee.
"No More Darkness, No More Light"– 2:56
"Louisville"– 3:34
"Little Light"– 3:32
"All You Got Is a Song"– 3:52
"I Get Weak"– 5:47
"Crooked"– 2:42
"Hang On, Hang On"– 4:10
"Don't Give a Damn Anymore"– 2:59
"Whiskey On Ice"– 3:31
"Don't Fade Away"– 5:01
Deluxe edition bonus tracks
"Little Bear"– 2:45
"Summer All Over"– 3:16
"Dying White Light"– 3:11
"What's Going On" (written by Al Cleveland/Marvin Gaye/Renaldo Benson)– 4:42
"No More Darkness, No More Light" (acoustic)– 3:37
"Don’t Give a Damn Anymore" (Blake Mills mix)– 2:54
"Song for Tops"– 3:50

Personnel
Amos Lee– guitar, vocals
Ethan Gruska
Greg Leisz– pedal steel guitar
Blake Mills
Rob Moose– strings
Benmont Tench– keyboards
Patrick Warren– keyboards

Technical personnel
Tony Berg– production
Tchad Blake– mixing
David Boucher– recording
Joseph Lorge– recording
Bob Ludwig– mastering

See also
List of 2018 albums

References

External links

Lee discussing the deluxe edition

2018 albums
Amos Lee albums
Albums produced by Tony Berg
Dualtone Records albums